Rockingham Senior High School  is a public co-educational high day school, located on Read Street in Rockingham, a suburb of Perth, Western Australia.

Overview 
The school was established in 1971 and caters for students from Year 7 to Year 12.

The school has offered a specialist maritime studies program at the Centre for Maritime Studies involving snorkelling, boating and first aid since 1991. Specialist sporting programs involving netball and basketball, as well as a Rugby League Academy are also offered. A cricket program was also formerly in place at the school, its final year was 2015.

The number of student enrolments has declined over the last five years. The school enrolled 955 students in 2007, then 944 in 2008, to 894 in 2009, then fell to 783 in 2010, 787 in 2011, 781 in 2012 and to 743 in 2013. Since the introduction of Year 7's into the School in 2015 the numbers have grown to over 900 students.

See also 

 List of schools in the Perth metropolitan area

References

External links 
 Rockingham Senior High School website

Public high schools in Perth, Western Australia
1971 establishments in Australia
Educational institutions established in 1971
Rockingham, Western Australia